The following articles list companies that operate ships:
 List of freight ship companies for companies that own and operate the freight ships (Bulk Carriers, Container Ships, Roll-on/Roll-off (for Freights), Tankers and Gas Carriers).
 List of container shipping companies by ship fleets and containers for the largest.
 List of passenger ship companies for companies that own and operate the passenger ships (Cruise Ships, Cargo-Passenger Ships, and Ferries (for Passengers and Automobiles))
For shipping agencies, or the companies that own and operate tugboats, fishing ships or so, see other pages.

External links